Schwarzman College (Chinese: 苏世民书院, pinyin: Sūshìmín Shūyuàn) is a residential college building located in Tsinghua University, Beijing, China. Completed in 2016, it hosts a one-year Master's Degree leadership program designed to cultivate the next generation of global leaders. The college was designed by the Driehaus Prize winner Robert A.M. Stern, former Dean of the Yale School of Architecture, and is the first academic building in China to have won a Leadership in Energy and Environmental Design (LEED) Gold Certification.

College and purpose

Mission
The college was founded to provide a residential college experience for Schwarzman Scholars. Students at the college study a one-year Master’s Degree in Global Affairs. During this time, the scholars live inside the Schwarzman College building.

Scholarship

Annually, 100-200 Schwarzman Scholars are chosen through a competitive selection process. Approximately 40% of the participants come from the U.S., 20% from China and 40% from the rest of the world. Students apply directly to the program and do not require a nomination from their university.

See also
 Schwarzman Scholars at Tsinghua University
 Rhodes Scholarship at Oxford University
 Gates Scholarship at Cambridge University

References

External links
 Schwarzman College website
 Schwarzman Scholars Program website
 Schwarzman Scholars website

Tsinghua University
New Classical architecture
Robert A. M. Stern buildings